Hunter von Leer (born in Terre Haute, Indiana; April 3, 1944) is an American actor who has appeared in films, television series, and television movies.

Biography
His first film role was in the 1972 movie Unholy Rollers. He also acted in the 1977 Mel Brooks parody High Anxiety and in Brooks' 1981 History of the World: Part 1. Hunter appeared in the 1981 John Carpenter horror movie Halloween II as Deputy Gary Hunt. His most recent film was the 2002 The Round and Round.

He starred on the daytime soap opera General Hospital as Larry Baker in 1977 and on the nighttime soap opera Dallas as terrorist B.D. Calhoun from 1986-1987. Von Leer has made guest appearances on many television series, including Night Gallery, The Rockford Files (twice), The Dukes of Hazzard, Quantum Leap and The West Wing.

He is a veteran professional shark fisherman. A hobby of his was skydiving.

Filmography

References

External links

1944 births
Male actors from Indiana
American male film actors
American male soap opera actors
American male television actors
Living people
Actors from Terre Haute, Indiana